The 1995 Rhode Island Rams football team was an American football team that represented the University of Rhode Island in the Yankee Conference during the 1995 NCAA Division I-AA football season. In their third season under head coach Floyd Keith, the Rams compiled a 7–4 record (6–2 against conference opponents) and finished first in the New England Division of the Yankee Conference.

Schedule

References

Rhode Island
Rhode Island Rams football seasons
Rhode Island Rams football